The 2019–20 season was the 6th consecutive season of İstanbul Başakşehir in the Süper Lig and their 30th year in existence. The season was slated to cover a period from 1 July 2019 to 30 June 2020. It was extended extraordinarily beyond 30 June due to the COVID-19 pandemic in Turkey.

On 19 July 2020, Başakşehir were crowned champions of the Turkish Süper Lig for the first time in the club's history. They also became only the sixth club in the competition's history to win the league title.

Players

Current squad

Out on loan

Transfers

In

Out

Pre-season and friendlies

Competitions

Overview

Süper Lig

League table

Results summary

Result round by round

Matches

Turkish Cup

Fifth round

Round of 16

UEFA Champions League

Third qualifying round

UEFA Europa League

Group stage

Knockout phase

Round of 32

Round of 16

References

External links

İstanbul Başakşehir F.K. seasons
İstanbul Başakşehir F.K.
İstanbul Başakşehir F.K.
Turkish football championship-winning seasons